Brodina is a commune located in Suceava County, Romania. It is composed of ten villages: Brodina, Brodina de Jos, Cununschi, Dubiusca, Ehrește, Falcău, Norocu, Paltin, Sadău, and Zalomestra.

At the 2002 census, 88% of inhabitants were Romanians and 11.4% Ukrainians. 80.2% were Romanian Orthodox, 17% Pentecostal and 1.2% Roman Catholic.

References

Communes in Suceava County
Localities in Southern Bukovina